Home and Away is an Australian television soap opera. It was first broadcast on the Seven Network on 17 January 1988. The following is a list of characters that appeared in 2016, by order of first appearance. All characters are introduced by the soap's executive producer, Lucy Addario. The 29th season of Home and Away began airing on 1 February 2016. Dylan Carter was introduced during the same episode. Isla Schultz and Lindsay Ford arrived in March. May saw the arrivals of Mick Jennings and Tori Morgan. Her brothers – Brody, Justin and Mason Morgan – were introduced in June. The following month, Tabitha Ford arrived. Hope Morrison and Raffy Morrison made their debuts in September, while Jeannie Woods made her first appearance in November. Justin's daughter Ava Gilbert was introduced in December.

Dylan Carter

Dylan Carter, played by Jeremy Lindsay Taylor, made his first appearance on 1 February 2016. Lindsay Taylor's casting was announced on 5 August 2015. He commented, "I have always wanted to be a part of this. Home and Away is an institution, it is iconic Australian TV. It is great to finally be a part of the family. I play a great role, my character is very complex and very interesting so that is really what drew me to it." Dylan Carter is a detective, who works alongside Katarina Chapman (Pia Miller), following his arrival in Summer Bay. Lindsay Taylor said Dylan would be kept busy and added that he had a connection to the Bay. The actor reprised his role in 2017. Dylan returned in September that year, as part of a storyline involving Robbo (Jake Ryan), who suffers from amnesia. Lindsay Taylor reprised the role for another guest stint in September 2019.

Dylan is the lead detective on the Charlotte King (Erika Heynatz) murder case, working alongside his former fiancée Katarina Chapman and Mike Emerson (Cameron Stewart). Dylan knows how uncomfortable Kat is when he signs up for the investigation, but Kat tells him that she is okay with his presence. Dylan and Kat question Martin Ashford (George Mason), Zac MacGuire (Charlie Clausen) and Zac and Charlotte's teenage son Hunter King (Scott Lee). Dylan asks Kat out to dinner as friends, but Kat refuses his offer as she is still affected by the abuse she suffered by Dylan. He apologises for his actions and Kat agrees that he should be sorry. Kat and Dylan question Irene Roberts (Lynne McGranger) over a piece of Irene's clothing being found at the crime scene but she is then cleared. Dylan asks Billie Ashford (Tessa de Josselin) a few questions and questions Phoebe Nicholson (Isabella Giovinazzo) about Ash's whereabouts on the night of the murder before he violently arrests Ash but is later cleared after Kat finds an alibi.  Kat and Dylan discover that Charlotte had a second phone and learn that she made a call to Kyle Braxton (Nic Westaway) half an hour before her murder. They soon come to a dead end with Kyle but they discover footage from the Bait Shop that clearly shows Zac following Charlotte. Dylan then charges Zac with Charlotte's murder.

Morag Bellingham (Cornelia Frances) represents Zac and she immediately clashes with Dylan. At Zac's bail hearing, Morag notices a suspicious look between the judge and Dylan moments after Zac is denied bail. Morag later confronts Dylan about it. Zac is later released after Morag finds an alibi proving that he was at the caravan park at the time of Charlotte's death. Dylan and Kat stray from work to reattach before they find an article of a sex tape of Charlotte and Matt Page (Alec Snow) that has been released to the public. Matt is questioned but cleared. Determined not to let Dylan win, Kat asks Zac's wife Leah Patterson-Baker (Ada Nicodemou) if she remembers anything that was dodgy. Leah remembers Morag saying she had bad feelings about a look between the judge and Dylan after Zac was denied bail. Kat pays a visit to the judge and blackmails him into confessing that Dylan knew about an affair the judge was having and used that to blackmail him to refuse Zac bail. Kat then takes the judge's statement to Phillip McCarthy (Nicholas Cassim) who is appalled. McCarthy brings in David Joyce (Don Halbert) who tells Dylan is suspended until further notice. When Kat is alone at the Farmhouse, Dylan approaches her and tells her how they belong together. Kat tells him to go, and when he grabs her arm, she pushes him to the ground. She tells him that he is pathetic and that she is not going to let him intimidate her anymore, and Dylan leaves. Dylan has a run-in with Billie at the gym. Dylan later attacks Ash and holds him, Billie and Kat hostage at 31 Saxon Avenue. Kat tells Dylan that he has not dealt with the death of his son Anton properly, and he is arrested.

The following year, the police find Dylan's blood and gun on an abandoned boat that is also linked to amnesic Robbo. Constable Corelli (Nick Cain) later finds CCTV footage of Dylan holding Robbo at gunpoint in a marina. Two years later, Robbo has a flashback to the day he and Dylan were on the boat together. He and Dylan fought and Dylan was shot, but as Robbo's back was turned, Dylan hit him with a metal pipe, knocking him into the water. He then saw Dylan being helped into a second boat, confirming that Dylan is still alive. Robbo is kidnapped while visiting his family's graves and held captive in an old bunker. Dylan reveals himself to be behind Robbo's kidnapping, as he knows Robbo has been looking for him. He tells Robbo that he was not responsible for having his family killed. Dylan and Robbo fight, and Robbo gets the upper hand. He handcuffs Dylan and takes him to meet Ouroboros gang leader Victor (Patrick Thompson), who tasked Robbo to find Dylan. Victor's gang and Dylan are arrested by the Australian Federal Police.  Several weeks later, Robbo learns that Dylan has been murdered in his prison cell.

Isla Schultz

Isla Schultz, played by singer Samantha Jade, made her first appearance on 3 March 2016. The character and Jade's casting was announced on 5 September 2015. Jade told Jonathon Moran of The Daily Telegraph, "I'm always asked when I will do more acting & now I am saying yes, I am coming to the Bay. It is really exciting. I've wanted to do more acting & I wanted to do something unexpected & different and this is very very different to Kylie (Minogue)." Jade began filming her first scenes three days after her casting announcement. She wrapped her stint on the show in November.

Isla comes to Summer Bay with "bad intentions" and Jade said she would have "a bit of a past". Isla also becomes a love interest for one of the male characters. Jade later described her character as "a bit naughty − a bit of a bad girl", as she has become involved with some bad people. However, Jade added that Isla would mean well.

Isla goes to Angelo's and flirts with Kyle Braxton (Nic Westaway), before informing someone on the phone that she has found him. Isla later tells Kyle that she works for Dave Rogers (Yure Covich), a man Kyle lost money to during a poker game in Melbourne. Dave has sent Isla to collect Kyle's debt, but Kyle does not pay up. When Dave makes threats, Kyle tries to get Isla out of Summer Bay to protect her, but Dave has them kidnapped and driven out to the bush. Dave gives Kyle and Isla a shovel and tells them to dig their own graves. They manage to escape and Kyle goes to the police. He lets Isla stay with him and they have sex. Isla's former partner, Harry Kingswood (Wayne Bradley), brings their daughters to Summer Bay to visit her. After spending the day with them, Isla later takes her daughter and Harry threatens to call the police. Kyle finds Isla working in a brothel and convinces her to return the girls to Harry. When Isla learns Harry is moving interstate, she buys a gun and tries to rob the Reefton Lakes golf club. Kyle finds out her plan and arrives to talk her out of it. He convinces her to run, just as the police storm the building. Kyle is arrested and charged with armed robbery. He refuses to give up Isla to the police as he wants her to have a better life with her daughters. Isla intends to hand herself in, but Kyle takes the money and the gun and gives them to the police with his fingerprints on them. Isla comes to see Ricky Sharpe (Bonnie Sveen), who informs her Kyle has been sentenced to thirteen years in prison. When Ricky tells Isla that she hopes she was worth it, Isla states that she will make sure she is. She adds that Kyle is the best man she has ever known, before leaving.

Lindsay Ford

Lindsay Ford, played by Georgia Flood, made her first appearance on 17 March 2016. Flood's casting was announced on 7 October 2015, while her character was revealed in March 2016. When Flood was offered the role, she was unsure that she could see herself on the show, but thought her character was "really cool" and accepted. She enjoyed filming her guest appearance, commenting, "I loved, loved doing it and would go back there in a heartbeat."

Lindsay tries to contact Hunter King (Scott Lee), but he refuses to take her calls. She later comes to the caravan park to see him. She introduces herself to Hunter's girlfriend Olivia (Raechelle Banno) and reveals that she was the person who picked Hunter up the night he left Summer Bay. Hunter thanks Lindsay for letting him stay with her and she explains that she wanted to see him after reading that his father is in prison. Lindsay also mentions that she plans on staying for a while, but adds that she does not want to ruin Hunter and Olivia's relationship. However, she later tells Olivia that she and Hunter kissed. Lindsay comes to check on Hunter and he apologises for leading her on, before asking her to leave so he can fix his relationship with Olivia. Lindsay runs into Olivia on the beach and implies that she and Hunter did more than just kiss. When Olivia later sees Lindsay with her arm around Hunter, she ends their relationship. Lindsay throws a party on the beach and pays Drew Panton (Govinda Roser-Finch) to make advances towards Olivia, so she can take a photo of them together. Hunter and Olivia break up. Lindsay goes to the diner and purposely annoys Olivia, who attempts to hit her. Lindsay meets up with Hunter, telling him that Olivia has moved on. They spend the day watching films and Lindsay tries to kiss Hunter, but he tells her he just wants to be friends. Lindsay steals Alf Stewart's (Ray Meagher) ute and Hunter is knocked unconscious trying to stop her. Lindsay flees the scene. She later meets up with Olivia, who tells her to leave town or she will call the police about Hunter's accident.

Mick Jennings

Mick Jennings, played by Kristian Schmid, made his first appearance on 5 May 2016. Mick was introduced as the long-lost son of established character Irene Roberts (Lynne McGranger). Shortly before his arrival, Irene revealed that she had been raped when she was 14 and gave birth to a baby when she was 15. The baby was given up for adoption. Mick was also revealed to be Billie Ashford's (Tessa de Josselin) rapist, a storyline which Daniel Kilkelly from Digital Spy branded "dark". Kilkelly also called Mick "twisted" and a "villain". A TV Week writer opined, "Wouldn't you hate to have a son like Mick?" Upon Mick's second appearance in the Bay, a columnist for New Idea commented, "There's not a soul in Summer Bay who doesn't want Mick to leave town for good."

Mick comes to the Beach House on the pretence that he is Chris Harrington's (Johnny Ruffo) uncle. Irene Roberts lets him wait inside with her. While looking through some photos, Mick makes a comment about Irene acting as a surrogate for her daughter. He tries to pass it off as something Chris told him, but Irene grows suspicious and tries to leave. Mick stops her and tells her she is not leaving him again. He then kidnaps Irene and uses her phone to text Olivia Fraser Richards (Raechelle Banno). Mick tells Irene that he is the son she gave up when she was a teenager, but she refuses to believe him. When Mick tries to abduct Olivia, she hides her phone in his car to allow the police to track him. Mick realises the police are closing in on him, so he prepares to move Irene to a new location, but she escapes and Mick is caught by the police. He is taken to the hospital, where a DNA test confirms that he is Irene's son. Billie Ashford realises Mick is her rapist after seeing a distinctive tattoo on his arm. Mick is released from the psychiatric hospital early and he returns to Summer Bay to see Irene, who tells him to stay away from her. Mick tries again to talk to Irene and grabs her arm. He is tasered by Kat Chapman (Pia Miller)  and arrested for breaching an AVO. He is checked out at the hospital, where he sees Billie with her newborn daughter Luc Patterson. He realises that he must be Luc's father and takes her from the hospital. He contacts Irene and asks her to meet him at the park, where he asks her to listen to him. Irene tells Mick that she never had the chance to hold him when he was born and Mick apologises to Irene for hurting her and Billie. Irene forgives him and Mick says goodbye to Luc, before handing her over to Irene. As Irene returns Luc to Billie, Mick surrenders to the police and is arrested. He later asks for access to Luc.

Months later, Mick calls Irene to try and let her know that he is up for parole from the psychiatric hospital, but she refuses to listen to him. Billie's brother Martin Ashford (George Mason) goes to see Mick at the hospital. When Mick realises who Ash is, he apologises for hurting Billie, but Ash lashes out and attacks him. Mick begs Irene to help him get out, but she decides she cannot support him. Mick is later granted parole. Irene visits him at a halfway house, where she discovers he has been attacked. She moves him to a motel in the Bay. While out walking, Mick comes across Maggie Astoni (Kestie Morassi) attempting to change a flat tyre. He helps her out and she invites him back to her house, where Olivia sees him and reveals that Mick is a rapist. Maggie's husband Ben Astoni (Rohan Nichol) throws him out. Irene tells Mick that she cannot be in his life anymore and Alf Stewart (Ray Meagher) arranges a job for Mick in the mines in Western Australia, but Mick refuses to leave. Mick Irene with Luc and tries to give her a teddy bear, but Irene asks him to leave. She collapses and Mick takes Luc back to her home, while Irene goes to the hospital. VJ Patterson (Matt Little) turns up and takes Luc from him, and Mick flees when Ash arrives. Ash later kidnaps Mick and takes him out to the bush, where he threatens to kill him. Mick falls over a cliff, but he manages to hang onto the edge despite dislocating his shoulder. He is rescued by Hunter King (Scott Lee), Mason Morgan (Orpheus Pledger) and Brody Morgan (Jackson Heywood). Mick tells Irene that he does not trust Ash and that Luc is not safe with him. Mick hires a lawyer and attempts to gain custody of Luc. When his medication runs out, he approaches Ziggy Astoni (Sophie Dillman) for help, but she is scared of him and runs away. She later makes a statement to the police, who question and release Mick. Mick suspects Ash is going to leave the Bay with Luc, but Irene assures him that is not true. He later learns that VJ left the Bay with Luc. Alf convinces him to take the job in WA, and Irene decides to go too, so she can help him settle in. Months later, Mick has a mining accident and Irene goes over there to support him

Tori Morgan

Tori Morgan, played by Penny McNamee, made her first appearance on 5 May 2016. The character and casting was announced on 22 November 2015. McNamee commented that the role was her "dream job" and something she had wanted since she began her acting career. She began filming her first scenes in early November and praised her co-star Georgie Parker for helping her out on set. Tori is a doctor who comes to Summer Bay for a fresh start. McNamee commented that she would have "dark secrets". In an interview with Ali Cromarty of TV Week, McNamee explained that Tori was running from something and came to check out Summer Bay for her family. Tori is the first of four Morgan siblings to arrive, and she wants to see if it is safe to bring her brothers there.

Brody Morgan

Brody Morgan, played by Jackson Heywood, made his first appearance on 7 June 2016. Heywood previously appeared on the show in 2009 as Lachie Cladwell. The character and Heywood's casting was announced on 5 December 2015, alongside James Stewart and Orpheus Pledger, who play Brody's brothers. The actors began filming their first scenes during the week commencing 7 December. Heywood expects the Morgan brothers to be compared to the Braxton brothers who were introduced to the show in 2011. He commented, "I can definitely see that, but I think we have a very different dynamic. It will be exciting to tell the story and as it will be revealed, it will be a very different story." Brody is a chef who has "big ambitions".

Justin Morgan

Justin Morgan, played by James Stewart, made his first appearance on 7 June 2016. The character and Stewart's casting was announced on 5 December 2015, alongside Jackson Heywood and Orpheus Pledger, who play Justin's brothers. The actors began filming their first scenes during the week commencing 7 December. Justin is Stewart's first on-going role since he took a year off to care for his young daughter. Like Heywood, Stewart expected Braxton brothers comparisons, but he told Jonathon Moran of The Daily Telegraph, "Creating this family is probably more our priority than taking over the Brax boys. How do you take on Steve Peacocke (Brax)? I hope Australia is ready for it, it is the way it is." In August 2017, Stewart was longlisted for Best Daytime Star at the Inside Soap Awards. The nomination did not progress to the viewer-voted shortlist.

Mason Morgan

Mason Morgan, played by Orpheus Pledger, made his first appearance on 7 June 2016. The character and Pledger's casting details were announced on 5 December 2015, alongside Jackson Heywood and James Stewart, who play Mason's brothers. The actors began filming their first scenes during the week commencing 7 December. Pledger relocated from his home town of Melbourne to Sydney for the role. Pledger described his character as having a "positive outlook on life" and someone who "stands up for what he believes in". Mason is a medical student, who struggles to fit to maintain a social life in between studying and working out in the gym.

Tabitha Ford

Tabitha Ford, played by Eliza Scanlen, made her first appearance on 21 July 2016. Johnathon Hughes of Digital Spy included Tabitha on his list of the "most evil mean girls in soap". He stated, "The scourge of Summer Bay High was obsessed with frenemy Olivia Fraser Richards and tried to steal the vulnerable teen's life by playing on her abusive past. Attempting to take Olivia's hunky boyfriend Hunter, terrible Tabitha turned more Single White Female than Mean Girls when she started dressing like her rival to tempt him." Hughes went on to say that Tabitha "crossed the line" when she posed as Olivia's abuser and that everyone in the Bay was relieved when she left for boarding school.

Tabitha approaches Olivia Fraser Richards (Raechelle Banno) to ask for directions for the Surf Club, and they recognise each other from group counselling. Olivia invites Tabitha to a school sleep out. Tabitha warns Olivia's former boyfriend Hunter King (Scott Lee) to stay away from Olivia. She tells Olivia that Hunter called her self-harm scars disgusting, and denies lying when confronted. Tabitha records Zac MacGuire (Charlie Clausen) entering his password in the school system, and she later uses it to change Hunter's exam result, which results in his suspension. Olivia discovers the video on Tabitha's phone and tells Zac, but Tabitha erases the video. Olivia later records Tabitha confessing to the switch and she ends their friendship. Tabitha starts dressing like Olivia and sneaks into Hunter's caravan to kiss him. Hunter kisses her back, mistaking her for Olivia. Tabitha tells Olivia what happened, hoping Olivia will break up with Hunter. Zac contacts Tabitha's parents about her behaviour and the police give her a warning. After Olivia cancels plans to go to the dance with him, Hunter goes to the Diner and notices Tabitha on her laptop. He becomes suspicious when Tabitha brings up his cancelled date. He takes the laptop from her and sees that she is blackmailing Olivia by pretending to be her abuser Kirk Sheppard. The following day, Olivia confronts Tabitha at school, as she packs up her belongings. Olivia and Hunter later see Tabitha and her sister, Juliette (Rose Marel), at the Diner and they eat lunch with them. Olivia wishes Tabitha well at her new school, and they say goodbye.

Hope Morrison

Hope Morrison, played by Jessica Falkholt, made her first appearance on 19 September 2016.

Hope attempts to hit Justin Morgan (James Stewart) with a piece of timber, after hearing him outside her home. Martin Ashford (George Mason) and Kat Chapman (Pia Miller) stop her from running away. Justin tells Hope that Atticus Decker (John Adam) is in the hospital. Her younger sister Raffy Morrison (Olivia Deeble) comes outside and reveals that Decker is their uncle. Justin tells Hope that Decker's car was deliberately run off the road. Spike Lowe (Jason Montgomery)  and his associates attempt to kidnap Raffy and Hope. Ash saves Raffy, but Hope is thrown into the waiting car and driven away. Spike takes Hope to the hospital and pretends to be her husband, so he can access Decker's room. Spike attempts to give Decker a lethal injection, but is stopped just in time and arrested. Raffy and Hope are invited to stay at the farmhouse with Kat and Phoebe Nicholson (Isabella Giovinazzo). Hope annoys Phoebe when she wears her clothes and eats her food. Hope accidentally breaks her phone and later accuses John Palmer (Shane Withington) of breaking it when he bumps into her. She asks for a few hundred dollars, which John refuses to pay. Justin gives Hope a part-time job at the garage, where she steals credit card details from customers. Hope tries to flee the Bay, but she is arrested and charged for misappropriation of funds.

On the day she is released, Justin tells Hope that Raffy is Decker's daughter and his half-sister. Hope packs up her and Raffy's belongings and steals Mason's car. She picks up Raffy, but the car breaks down and they are forced to walk. Hope slips and falls down a steep bank, causing a tear in her liver. Raffy flags down Nate Cooper (Kyle Pryor) and he treats Hope, before she is taken to the hospital for surgery. While she recovers, Hope tells Raffy not to trust the Morgans. Raffy soon learns that she is related to the Morgans and that Hope is not her sister. She and Hope decide to leave the Bay. Hope steals money from Salt, but she is caught and arrested by Kat. Hope is sent to remand, but she is brought back to the Yabbie Creek police station when she struggles to cope being in solitary confinement. Hope struggles to sleep, so Nate Cooper (Kyle Pryor) prescribes her some diazepam. Hope steals some sleeping pills from his kit and takes an accidental overdose, resulting in her hospitalisation. Hope apologises to Phoebe and asks her to look after Raffy. After Hope is discharged, she is able to say goodbye to Raffy before she is taken back to prison. She encourages Raffy to trust the Morgans and tells Justin to take care of Raffy. Hope was then escorted back to prison by the police. A year later, Hope send Raffy a hand-made card for her 14th birthday.

Raffy Morrison 

Raffy Morrison, played by Olivia Deeble, made her first appearance on 19 September 2016. Details of Deeble's casting and her character were announced on 9 September. The actress relocated to Sydney from Melbourne for filming, and she has a three-year contract with the show. On 10 May 2019, Jonathon Moran of The Daily Telegraph reported that Deeble had finished filming with the serial. Deeble chose not to renew her contract. Her final scenes as Raffy aired on 12 September 2019.

Raffy hears her sister Hope Morrison (Jessica Falkholt) talking to Justin Morgan (James Stewart) about their uncle Atticus Decker (John Adam), who is in the hospital. Raffy is almost kidnapped by Spike Lowe (Jason Montgomery) and his associates, but saved by Martin Ashford (George Mason). However, Hope is taken. Kat Chapman (Pia Miller) tells Raffy that the police will find Hope. Raffy then breaks down and admits that she has no one else. However Hope was safe and she and Raffy move into the Farmhouse with Katarina Chapman (Pia Miller), Billie Ashford (Tessa de Josselin) and Phoebe Nicholson (Isabella Giovinazzo). Raffy attends Summer Bay High and befriends Eloise Page (Darcey Wilson). Decker later reveals to the Morgans that he had an affair with their mother, Kate Lee née Sparrow, and that Raffy is in fact their half-sister and Hope's cousin. Raffy found out the truth after finding DNA test results at the Morgan's house and confronts Justin and Tori Morgan (Penny McNamee) who come clean, telling her that their mother Kate is her real mum and Decker is her real dad. Raffy was hurt and upset by this and runs away. Hope convinces Raffy to run away with her and she accepts. But their plan fails as Hope gets arrested. Raffy found out from Justin that Hope got arrested and refuses to leave with Justin. Raffy meets Hope again and Hope tells her that she's going back to prison and will stay there 6 months or a year and tells her that she should stay with the Morgans. But Raffy refuses to leave Hope, but Hope gave Raffy to Justin and Raffy cries in Phoebe's arms as Hope is taken away by the police. Raffy learnt from her siblings that their parents were murdered by drug dealers and that they are under witness protection. Raffy runs away and ends up at the Farmhouse. Raffy almost exposes the Morgans' secret to Kat, but Phoebe arrives in time, able to stop Raffy revealing her siblings' secrets. Phoebe tells her to grow up and show some respect to her older siblings. A week later, Raffy found out Decker was shot. But at the hospital, Tori told her that Decker didn't make it and Raffy runs off in tears, with Mason running after her and comforting her in his arms.

Brody who was on drugs, shouted at Raffy and Justin was furious. Justin was even more angry when Brody drove high speed with Raffy inside. When Eloise told her that her brother Matt Page (Alec Snow) and his fiancée Evelyn MacGuire (Philippa Northeast) invites her to go to Vietnam with them, which she refuses to go. Raffy tells her that Matt isn't her legal guardian, nor is Evelyn. But Eloise changed her mind. Raffy attends to Matt and Evelyn's wedding at the Farmhouse and the next day, she says goodbye to Elly as she left for Vietnam with Matt and Evelyn. Raffy meets her niece and Justin's daughter Ava Gilbert (Grace Thomas) who showed up at Summer Bay from the city. Raffy later plays with Justin and Ava at the beach. One day, Raffy was told by her siblings that she has to move out, due to Brody's drug addiction got worse and Raffy moves in with John Palmer (Shane Withington) and Marilyn Chambers (Emily Symons), but is hurt that she cannot live her family. Raffy befriended with newcomer Coco Astoni (Anna Cocquerel), who moves to Summer Bay from the city with her family. Raffy stood up for Coco when she was bullied by Jennifer Dutton (Brittany Santariga), but Coco tells Raffy to back off. 

When Brody became addicted to drugs, Raffy moves in with John Palmer (Shane Withington) and Marilyn Chambers (Emily Symons). New school principal Maggie Astoni asked Raffy move up in her daughter, Coco's year and she refuses but later change her mind. But Raffy struggles as she is also bullied by Jennifer too. While waiting for the bus, Raffy encounters former student, Mackenzie (Luke Davis), who offers her a ride home and she accepts a lift. Once getting into his truck, Mackenzie takes advances towards her, by putting his hand on her leg, making Raffy uncomfortable and she tries to leave the truck, but Mackenzie drives off with Raffy inside. Raffy begs him to let her out, but he refuses. Raffy was saved by Robbo (Jake Ryan). 

When Coco starts hanging out with Jennifer and her friends, Raffy felt left out, and it strain their friendship. Raffy helps Olivia Fraser Richards with her fashion designs but accidentally cut all of Olivia's fabrics. Olivia gets angry and called Raffy "stupid". Raffy flees and took all her anger and accidentally threw a rock at Roo Stewart's (Georgie Parker) car, which is witnessed by Maggie and her husband Ben Astoni (Rohan Nichol). While attending to Olivia's fashion launch party at Salt, Jennifer gives Raffy alcohol to drink, while still underage. Raffy gets drunk and takes more drinks, until being caught by Brody. Raffy confronts Jennifer for getting her drunk and pushes her, but was caught Maggie. Raffy admits to Maggie, John and Marilyn that she hates school. Justin seeing how much she misses her family, decided to let her move back with him again and Raffy agrees and she moves back with the Morgans. Raffy and Coco reconcile their friendship and Raffy befriended with Ryder Jackson (Lukas Radovich) and takes a liking to him. But finds out that Coco also taking a liking to Ryder and tells Coco to pursue Ryder.

While taking Alf Stewart (Ray Meagher)'s boat for a joyride with Ryder, they both discover the dead body of Dennis Novak. They quickly flee and Ryder ask her to keep it quiet and she agrees. But Raffy started having nightmares which worries her brothers and Raffy tells Justin and Mason about the body. At first they thought she was joking until she took them to the scene, and called the police. Raffy and Ryder joins Coco when she has been protesting the community. Raffy later tells Ryder that Coco likes him. Raffy was devastated when she learned that Kat has died in a car accident. Raffy and Ryder supports Coco when Maggie is diagnosed with cancer. Raffy. Raffy moves back in with John and Marilyn when Robbo is in hiding. Raffy meets John and Marilyn's new foster son Ty Anderson (Darius Williams) and they didn't get along well at first and started fighting. When Ty tells her that John and Marilyn will never love her like their own, Raffy slaps him. Roo tells them to apologise but they refuse. Raffy apologise to Ty and they start to get along and bond. Ty stood up for Raffy when another student shoves her. But they argue again when Ty refuses to let her listen to his music.

Ty later lets her listen to his music and while listening to it, he kisses her, only to be walked in by Justin and John. Justin takes her home. Raffy and Ty meets up at the beach and they share another kiss. Raffy moved back in with John and Marilyn the next day. Ty and Raffy began a relationship but Ty became close to Ryder and Raffy assumes Ty has lost interest in her. Raffy visits Ty at the hospital after he got injured in the bush. Ty tells her that he's gay and Raffy felt like he's using her and they broke up, leaving her heartbroken. Raffy was bullied by Abbi Springwell about her break up with Ty. Raffy became distant towards Ty and Ryder, but later she and Ty remain as friends. Ty and Raffy helps Ryder and Coco get back together. When Ty's estranged mother Jodi Anderson (Sara Zwangobani) comes to the bay, Raffy supports Ty and encourages him to talk to her. Raffy and Ty says their final goodbye when he leaves with his mother. Raffy, Ryder and Coco goes camping together and Ryder takes them to an old hideout of the River Boys and they found underground hideout. But the roof collapsed and Raffy was trapped after getting hit in the head.

Raffy is rescued by Dean Thompson (Patrick O'Connor), Colby Thorne (Tim Franklin) and Chelsea Campbell (Ashleigh Brewer) and is taken to hospital. Raffy began to have seizures and learns that she has epilepsy. Raffy and Ryder starts to have feelings for each other and they start a relationship. But Coco, became hurt after she and Ryder has broken up a few months, but accepts them to be together. Raffy learns that Tori is pregnant with Robbo's baby. Raffy's epilepsy gets worse and Mason use drugs to make an epilepsy oil to stop the seizures. But Mason was arrested after he was caught getting drugs. Raffy befriended with Colby's sister Bella Nixon (Courtney Miller). Raffy learns that Brody cheated on his wife Ziggy Astoni (Sophie Dillman) with Simone Bedford (Emily Eskell), Raffy confronts Simone for ruin Brody and Ziggy's marriage. Raffy was accused of graffitiing Simone's office, but turns Bella was responsible as she wants to impress Raffy. Raffy accepts Simone and Raffy befriended with John and Marilyn's adoptive son Jett James (Will McDonald) who helps her with her studies. Raffy and Ryder were unable to spend time together due to their schedules and they break up. Raffy became devastated as Tori was taken into witness protection with Robbo and his wife Jasmine Delaney (Sam Frost). Raffy got accepted to a medical trial, which is in Victoria and Justin tells her that Brody and Simone would be happy to have her move in with them if she accepts the trial. Raffy accept her medical trial. She says goodbye to her family and friends, and left a letter to John and Marilyn before leaving Summer Bay.

Jeannie Woods

Jeannie Woods, played by Anna Bamford, made her first appearance on 1 November 2016. Bamford was on-screen for approximately six weeks. Jeannie was introduced as a potential love interest for Brody Morgan (Jackson Heywood). She comes to Summer Bay after Evelyn MacGuire (Philippa Northeast) invites her to play in a volleyball match at the local youth centre. Bamford told Stephen Downie of TV Week that Jeannie and Brody would form "an unusual relationship". She also said that she developed a good friendship with Heywood during filming.

Jeannie sees Brody Morgan drop some barbecue supplies and helps him pick them up. Jeannie signs up for the charity beach volleyball game, and she is paired with Matt Page (Alec Snow). Brody offers Evelyn MacGuire $1000 to play the last match with Jeannie. He later tries to give Jeannie a bracelet he thinks she dropped, but it actually belongs to Matt's sister, Eloise Page (Darcey Wilson). Jeannie then disappears. Days later, she returns for a job interview and comes across Brody on the beach, where she gets him to ask her out for a drink. Brody walks to work in the same direction as Jeannie and she thinks he is following her. She soon learns Brody owns the restaurant where she has her interview. Jeannie leaves when the interview does not go well, but she later returns to start over with Brody, who gives her the job. Brody trains Jeannie on her first day, and they flirt with each other. They share a drink at the end of the day and Jeannie thanks Brody with a kiss on the cheek. When he tries to kiss her back, she shoves him and he tells her to leave.

Jeannie returns to apologise, and while Brody does not fire her, she decides to quit. She tells Evie that she overreacted and that she likes Brody, but did not want to jeopardise her job. That night, Jeannie meets Brody at Salt and he offers her the job back. Jeannie accepts and kisses him. They arrange a dinner date at Brody's house. Jeannie turns up in tears and tells Brody that her parents have thrown her out. The following day, Jeannie's father, Randall (Paul Ceaser) turns up at the house looking for her. Once he has calmed down, Jeannie introduces him to Brody. After he leaves, Jeannie tells Brody that her parents are doomsday preppers. Jeannie and Brody agree to date in secret. Randall later follows Jeannie to work and finds her and Brody kissing. Brody ends up insulting Randall and his beliefs. He later apologises to Jeannie and she accepts that her father's ideas can seem strange. They agree to a fresh start, but they fall out again when Brody makes a joke about doomsdays preppers. They decide to stop seeing each other, and Jeannie quits the restaurant for a job in Yabbie Creek.

Ava Gilbert

Ava Gilbert made her first appearance on 8 December 2016. She is Justin Morgan's (James Stewart) daughter. Ava was originally played by Grace Thomas upon her introduction, followed by Alice Roberts. The role was recast to Annabel Wolfe in February 2023. The recast allowed writers to give Ava more grown up storylines, as she is now a teenager. Ava makes an unannounced return to the Bay to see her father, but she is unable to hide her admiration for his apprentice Theo Poulos (Matt Evans). Wolfe thought the storyline would be relatable to "father-daughter relationships", saying "Until now, Ava has appeared on the show only as a 'little girl' or at a stage of pre-adolescence, Justin quickly realises how much she's grown up in his absence – not only physically, but mentally." Wolfe also said this would lead to problems as they struggle to understand one another. Justin learns from Ava's mother that she has been talking to a boy online, so when they argued about it, she left for the Bay. While Justin pushes Ava into opening up to him about the boy, Theo and Kirby Aramoana (Angelina Thomson) defend her, pointing out that it is likely just a crush. Wolfe told Tamara Cullen of TV Week that Ava would "bring chaos" to Justin's life with her rebellious, resentful attitude.

While Ava is walking home from school, she notices Justin Morgan leaving his cap behind on a bench and returns it to him. Justin realises that she is his daughter when she enters Nina Gilbert's (Zoe Naylor) house. Weeks later, Ava turns up at Justin's house, having left the city on a bus. She asks Justin if he is her father and he confirms that he is. Ava bonds with Justin's fiancée Phoebe Nicholson and his sister Raffy Morrison. Ava's stepfather Brian Gilbert (Tom O'Sullivan) comes to collect her and gets into an argument with Justin, causing her to run off. She is struck by Patrick Stanwood's (Luke McKenzie) car. Brian later allows Justin to spend time with Ava. When Nina and Brian go away for a few days, Ava comes to stay with Justin and befriends Scarlett Snow (Tania Nolan). Months later, Ava returns to the Bay to see Justin and meets his girlfriend Willow Harris (Sarah Roberts), who she bonds with. Ava is kidnapped by Boyd Easton (Steve Le Marquand) and his mother Hazel Easton (Genevieve Lemon). When Boyd is found with Ava, Willow helps saves her and tells her to run, where she is rescued by Justin and Colby Thorne (Tim Franklin). Justin and Willow's relationship ends and Nina bans Justin from seeing Ava for a while. 

Ava returns to the Bay to stay with Justin and meets his new partner Leah Patterson (Ada Nicodemou), whom she initially seems to dislike. Leah offers Ava a piece of quiche, but Ava gives it to Buddy. After seeing Justin and Leah kissing, Ava asks to go home. Justin becomes suspicious of Ava's strange behaviour and asks her if something happened back at home. Ava admits that Nina and Brian had an argument and Brian has moved out. Ava soon bonds with Leah, after playing football together with Justin, and she agrees to visit more often. Nina later asks Justin to look after Ava, as she and Brian have decided to break up. Justin learns Ava is not allowed to contact Brian and he and Leah take her camping. He later persuades Nina to let Ava speak to Brian. After Justin's sister Tori Morgan (Penny McNamee) is hospitalised, a struggling Justin takes Ava to visit Brody Morgan (Jackson Heywood) and Raffy Morrison (Olivia Deeble) in Yarra Valley, and then returns her to Nina. Tori later invites Ava to visit Justin, but he decides to go to the city to see her and then brings her back to the Bay. Justin tells Ava that he has a tumour on his spine and he agrees to have surgery to remove it. Not wanting Ava around if the surgery goes wrong, he spends the day with her, before sending her back to the city.

Others

References

External links
Characters and cast at the official Home and Away website
Characters and cast at the Internet Movie Database

, 2016
Home and Away